Helladia (5th-century) was an Ancient Roman stage artist. 

She is mentioned as a famous stage actor within pantomime in several epigram. She appears to have been well known by her contemporaries. One of her most celebrated roles were the role of the male hero Hector of the Trojan war, which illustrates that women could play male parts on stage in antiquity. 

She was possibly the same Helladia who was depicted on an ivory comb which is kept at the Louvre.

References

 Jan Sewell, Clare Smout,  The Palgrave Handbook of the History of Women on Stage

Ancient Roman actors
Ancient actresses
5th-century Roman women